The Cañadón Asfalto Formation is a  Lower Jurassic to Late Jurassic geologic formation, from the Jurassic period of the Mesozoic Era. Its age is controversial, uranium-lead dating of the volcanic tuff beds having given various different ages. A Recent work suggested that the base of the formation was formed around 171 Ma, during the upper Aalenian, while the main age for the Lower Las Chacritas Member being around 168 Ma, during the Bajocian, Bathonian and Callovian While the overlying Puesto Almada Member seems to be around 158 ma, or Oxfordian age, that changed thanks to the discovery of zircons near the location of discovery of Bagualia, allowing a precise age of Las Charcitas Member as Middle-Late Toarcian, 178-179 million years, and a later study constrained the age of the formation as Middle Toarcian-Lower Bajocian, being contemporaneous to the Chon Aike volcanic activity, being a local equivalent to Antarctica's Mawson Formation.

It is located in the Cañadón Asfalto Basin, a rift basin in Chubut Province of northwestern Patagonia, in southern Argentina. The basin started forming in the earliest Jurassic.

It is composed of fluvial-lacustrine deposits, typically sandstones and shales with a saline paleolake carbonate evaporitic sequence of limestone in its lowest Las Chacritas Member. Interbedded with these are volcanic tuffites. It is divided into two members, the Las Chacritas Member, and the overlying Puesto Almada member, but the latter has also been assigned to the overlying Cañadón Calcáreo Formation by other authors.

According to a palynological study, the dominant pollen was produced by the conifer families Cheirolepidiaceae (Classopollis) and Araucariaceae (mainly Araucariacites and Callialasporites), suggesting that warm-temperate and relatively humid conditions under highly seasonal climate prevailed during the depositional times of the unit. The abundance of Botryococcus supports the presence of a shallow lake with probably saline conditions.

Vertebrate fauna

Amphibians

Turtles

Lepidosaurs

Pterosaurs

Crocodylomorpha

Dinosaurs

Mammals

Plant remains

See also 

 List of dinosaur-bearing rock formations
 Mawson Formation
 Chon Aike Formation
 La Matilde Formation

References

Bibliography 
 
 

 
Geologic formations of Argentina
Jurassic System of South America
Sandstone formations
Limestone formations
Shale formations
Conglomerate formations
Tuff formations
Fluvial deposits
Lacustrine deposits
 
Jurassic paleontological sites
Mesozoic paleontological sites of South America
Fossiliferous stratigraphic units of South America
Paleontology in Argentina
Geology of Chubut Province